The Last Generation (German ) is a group of activists fighting climate change. Their civil disobedience methods, such as desecrating artworks or blocking roads, tend to generate public outrage. In 2022, the group performed 276 road blockades in Germany. In Rome, they threw soup at a van Gogh painting behind glass, called . In Potsdam, they threw mashed potatoes onto a Monet painting. None of the artworks they attacked were damaged.

The group was formed by participants of the 2021  which blockaded highways in Berlin. They chose their name to signal that Earth is approaching climate tipping points and that their generation is the last that can prevent climate collapse.

Goals and topics 
The group states that there is a climate emergency, and demands that citizens decide their own future via citizens' assemblies, while the cost of solving the climate crisis should not be borne by workers, but rather by the rich. The group demands a debt cut and payments to states of the Global South as compensation for climate change.

In early 2023 the group declared parliamentarian democracy to be unfit for dealing with the climate crisis and demanded the installation of so-called "Society councils" to work out emergency measures. The members of those councils should be selected by sortition from various backgrounds and age classes. Existing conventional political institutions should then be obliged to implement the councils' decisions exactly as agreed.

Methods 

The Last Generation's main method is road blockades, while at the beginning of the movement, the group also frequently distributed food from dumpsters for free.

History of actions 
The Last Generation state that they performed 370 actions between January and October 2022.

In October 2022, two Last Generation activists threw mashed potatoes at a Monet painting behind glass, titled Grainstacks. The painting is part of the impressionism collection of Hasso Plattner, a German billionaire, at the Museum Barberini in Potsdam. Plattner reportedly paid 111 million euros for the painting in 2019. The painting was left undamaged. However, the museum stated that the frame was damaged, and estimated that its restoration would have a 5-figure cost (i.e., 10,000 to 99,999 euros).

Similarly, in November 2022 the Last Generation threw soup at 'The Sower' by Vincent van Gogh, also behind glass, at the Palazzo Bonaparte in Rome, Italy. The painting, which was on loan from the Dutch Kröller-Müller Museum, suffered no damage, like another van Gogh painting targeted by a similar protest by Just Stop Oil two weeks earlier in London.

In February 2023, motorists tried to themselves remove Last Generation protesters from a motorway near the event venue ICC Berlin, with one car driver running over a protester's foot. The police were at the scene and initiated criminal proceedings against the driver, on suspicion of simple bodily harm.

Funding 
In late 2022, the conservative Welt am Sonntag newspaper reported that the Last Generation pays its activists up to 1,300 euros per month. The money is paid out by an organisation called "Wandelbündnis" in Berlin, but originates from the Climate Emergency Fund in the United States.

Controversy 
Two Last Generation activists did not appear in court in Bad Cannstatt in early 2023. They were on trial for blocking a federal highway in late 2022. News reports emerged that they had flown to Bali on holiday. However, the Last Generation issued a statement pointing out that their members had actually travelled to Thailand and that this had been agreed to by the court. They booked the flights as private individuals, not as activists, the group said. These two things should be treated differently, the statement went on.

External links 

 Website for Germany
 Website for Austria

References 

Civil disobedience
2021 establishments
Environmental organisations based in Germany